Epi-Inositol is one of the stereoisomers of inositol.

Use in medicine 
Epi-inositol has been found to regulate Yeast INO1 Gene Encoding (Inositol-1-P synthase) in animals.  During the study with Epi-Inositol, Yeast INO1-expression was measured in northern blots.

See also
allo-Inositol
cis-Inositol
D-chiro-Inositol
L-chiro-Inositol
muco-Inositol
neo-Inositol
scyllo-Inositol

References

Inositol